Titiri (Aymara titi Andean mountain cat; lead, -(i)ri a suffix, also spelled Titire) is a  mountain in the Andes of southern Peru. It is situated in the Tacna Region, Tarata Province, on the border of the districts Tarata and Ticaco. Titiri lies near the village of Ch'allapallqa (Challapalca) southwest of the mountain Tuma Tumani. The Mawri River (Mauri) flows along its northern slopes.

References

Mountains of Tacna Region
Mountains of Peru